Brian John Trotter (born December 1943) is a South African-born British philatelist who signed the Roll of Distinguished Philatelists in 2010. He was chairman of the London 2010 International Stamp Exhibition.

Publications
 Bechuanalands & Botswana, postal marking classification (1995)
 Revenues of Southern Africa, Part 1: The Bechuanalands with Neville Midwood, (2003) 
 The Edwardian Stamps of the South African Colonies (2004)
 Southern African Mails, Routes, Rates and Regulations 1806-1916 RPSL (2017)

References

British philatelists
Signatories to the Roll of Distinguished Philatelists
Living people
1943 births
Presidents of the Royal Philatelic Society London